Sean Roberts may refer to:

 Sean Roberts (footballer) (born 1983), South African football goalkeeper
 Sean Roberts (cricketer) (1968–2017), New Zealand cricketer
 Sean Roberts (athlete), Australian runner in the 2014 Commonwealth Games
 Sean Roberts (Oklahoma politician), American member of the Oklahoma House of Representatives
 Sean Roberts, pseudonym of Yuri Lowenthal (born 1971), American voice actor

See also
 Shaun Roberts (Guardians of Time Trilogy), a character in the novels by Marianne Curley
 Shawn Roberts (born 1984), Canadian actor